Galium pumilum, the slender bedstraw or small bedstraw, is a plant species of the genus Galium.

References

pumilum
Flora of Europe
Plants described in 1770
Taxa named by Johan Andreas Murray